The biodiversity of Assam, a state in North-East India, makes it a biological hotspot with many rare and endemic plant and animal species. The greatest success in recent years has been the conservation of the Indian rhinoceros at the Kaziranga National Park, but a rapid increase in human population in Assam threatens many plants and animals and their natural habitats.

The rhinoceros, tiger, deer or chital / futukihorina (Axis axis), swamp deer or dolhorina (Cervus duvauceli duvauceli), clouded leopard (Neofelis nebulosa), hoolock gibbon, pygmy hog or nol-gahori (Porcula salvania), hispid hare, golden langur (Trachypithecus geei), golden cat, giant civet, binturong, hog badger, porcupine, and civet are found in Assam. Moreover, there are abundant numbers of Gangetic dolphins, mongooses, giant squirrels and pythons. The largest population of wild water buffalo anywhere is in Assam. 

The major birds in Assam include the blue-throated barbet or hetuluka (Megalaima asiatica), white-winged wood duck or deuhnah (Asarcornis scultulata), Pallas's fish eagle or kuruwa (Haliaeetus leucoryphus), great pied hornbill or rajdhonesh (Buceros bicornis homrai), Himalayan golden-backed three-toed wood-pecker or barhoituka (Dinopium shorii shorii), and migratory pelican.

Assam is also known for orchids and for valuable plant species and forest products.

Protected areas in Assam 
There are several protections in Assam, including several national parks, in particular in the Brahmaputra Valley.

National parks
 Manas National Park (560 km2)
 Kaziranga National Park (320 km2)
 Orang National Park (110 km2)
 Nameri National Park (90 km2)
 Dibru-Saikhowa National Park (490 km2)

Wildlife sanctuaries
 Garampani Wildlife Sanctuary
 Laokhowa Wildlife Sanctuary
 Bornadi Wildlife Sanctuary
 Chakrashila Wildlife Sanctuary
 Bura Chapori Wildlife Sanctuary
 Pani Dihing Wildlife Sanctuary
 Hollongapar Wildlife Sanctuary
 Pobitora Wildlife Sanctuary
 Sonai Rupai Wildlife Sanctuary
 Bherjan-Borajan-Padumoni Wildlife Sanctuary
 East Karbi-Anglong Wildlife Sanctuary
 Nambor Wildlife Sanctuary
 Marat Longri Wildlife Sanctuary
 Nambor - Doigrung Wildlife Sanctuary
 Amchang Wildlife Sanctuary
 Dehing Patkai Wildlife Sanctuary
 Borail Wildlife Sanctuary
 Deepar Beel Wildlife Sanctuary
 Bordoibam Bilmukh Bird Wildlife Sanctuary (Proposed)
 North K. Anglong Wildlife Sanctuary (Proposed)

See also 
 Brahmaputra Valley semi-evergreen forests
 Physical geography of Assam
 Rhino poaching in Assam

Notes

References 
 Biodiversity of Assam: Status Strategy & Action Plan for Conservation, eds A K Bhagabati, M C Kalita, S Baruah, Eastern Book House, New Delhi  (2006)

External links 
 

Assam
Biota of Assam
Tourism in Assam